Serbo-Croatian vernacular has over time borrowed and adopted a lot of words of Turkish origin. The Ottoman conquest of the Balkans began a linguistical contact between Ottoman Turkish and South Slavic languages, a period of influence since at least 1389 up until the 20th century, when large terriotories of Shtokavian-speaking areas became conquered and made into provinces of the Ottoman Empire, into what was collectively known as Rumelia. As Ottoman Turkish language itself extensively borrowed from Arabic, Persian and Central Asian Turkic languages other than itself, many words of such origins also entered Serbo-Croatian via Turkish. Numerous migrations in the war-torn Western Balkans helped spread Shtokavian and its enriched vernacular. Some Turkisms in Serbo-Croatian have entered the language through other languages, such as Italian, while some words of Greek origin have been adopted in their Turkish forms.

Over the passage of time, many Turkish loanwords were completely adopted into standardized varieties of Serbo-Croatian and are no longer considered loanwords, if not for lack of true synonyms. Numerous such Turkisms (e.g. , or ) are often preferred to later introduced Germanisms and Latinisms. This is mostly the case with the Croatian variety of Serbo-Croatian, which has historically been more stringent to internationalisms. Out of all four varieties of the language, Bosnian has by far introduced and retained the most of Turkisms, largely due to its cultural Islamic ties. Turkish loanwords underwent pronunciation changes, principally on gender suffixes and adaptations of  that are non-existent in Serbo-Croatian. Turkisms are also commonly called "Orientalisms".

Characteristics
Turkisms often end in one of the following suffixes: –luk, –ci, –li, which come from the original –lik, –çi, –lı. Other suffixes include –ak, –hana, –ija, –suz and –uk. Persian –dār is also a common suffix. Many Serbo-Croatian words that are not of Turkish, Arabic or Persian origin have adopted these suffixes (e.g. ), showing that influence of Turkish onto Serbo-Croatian extends past loanwords, into morphology and other linguistic characteristics.

Number of Turkish loanwords

There is an uncertainly high number of Turkish (including Arabic and Persian) loanwords in the modern Serbo-Croatian language, mostly contained within the prestige Shtokavian dialect, and fewer in Kajkavian and Chakavian. The first edition of Srpski rječnik from 1818 listed around 2,500 Turkisms among 26,270 total words (~9,5%), while the second edition from 1852 listed around 3,700 out of 40,000 (~9,25%).

Orientalist expert Olga Zirojević deems that a lot more Turkish loanwords have been used in Serbia's distant past - around 8,000 - than in the present, which is estimated to be around 3,000. First dictionary of Turkisms in Serbia was written by Djordje Popović-Daničar in 1884, called Turkish and other Eastern words in our language. The book contains around 6,000 words. Another academic, Dušan Marjanović, compiled a corpus of 5,000 Turkisms in early 1930s.

A prominent Sharia and jurist writer  spent several years at the Institute for the study of folklore of University of Sarajevo thoroughly documenting Turkisms in the folk literature of Bosnia and Herzegovina. He subsequently created the most comprehensive dictionary of Turkisms, first published in 1957 in two volumes, then called Turkisms in the vernacular and folk literature of Bosnia and Herzegovina. Encouraged by great interest among domestic and international scientists and the demand for the dictionary, Škaljić expanded his research to the entirety of Serbo-Croatian-speaking area. In 1965 he published the dictionary named Turkisms in the Serbo-Croatian language, which after several additions and revisions ended up having 8,742 words and 6,878 terms.

An academic research in the Croatian dialectological field was done by Silvana Vranić and Sanja Zubčić at the University of Rijeka. They analyzed a corpus of 443 Shtokavian, 122 Chakavian and 95 Kajkavian phrasemes typical of Croatian speech, in which they found 118, 45 and 29 Turkisms respectively. The ratio of phrasemes per Turkisms was found to be 4.1, 2.7 and 3.3 respectively, showing that Shtokavian contains the most Turkisms, although not equally distributed along regions where it is spoken - the most were found in Dalmatian Hinterland at 39%, then Slavonia at 36%, and Lika at 25%.

List of loanwords
Only a number of Turkish loanwords are common to all four standardized varieties of Serbo-Croatian. Many more Turkisms lie in the vernacular speeches, which vary across regions and cultures. A large number of such loanwords are mainly found in the Bosnian standard, and are considered colloquial or non-existent in other varieties.

Food and cuisine loanwords

See also
 Arabic-Persian-Greek-Serbian Conversation Textbook

References

Turkish Origin
Turkish Origin
Turkish Origin
Turkish Origin
Turkish Origin
Linguistics lists
Lists of loanwords